Mayerling is a village and hunting lodge in Lower Austria.

Mayerling may also refer to:

 The Mayerling incident, the events that took place at the hunting lodge in 1889
 Mayerling (ballet) by Sir Kenneth MacMillan (1978)
 Mayerling (1936 film), a film directed by Anatole Litvak  starring Charles Boyer and Danielle Darrieux 
 De Mayerling à Sarajevo, a 1940 French film directed by Max Ophüls
 Le Secret de Mayerling (1949 film), directed by Jean Delannoy with Denise Benoît and Dominique Blanchar
 Mayerling (1956 film) also known as Kronprinz Rudolfs letzte Liebe directed by Rudolf Jugert (Germany) 
 Mayerling (1957 film) (US; released theatrically in Europe), starring Audrey Hepburn and Mel Ferrer
 Mayerling (1968 film) ,directed by Terence Young, starring Omar Sharif, Catherine Deneuve, James Mason and Ava Gardner

See also
 Mayerling or 'Meyerling, a fictional character in Agatha Christie's novel The Big Four